The Antarctic Treaty issue is a postage stamp that was issued by the United States Post Office Department on June 23, 1971. Designed by Howard Koslow, it commemorates the ten-year anniversary of the Antarctic Treaty, and is notable as Koslow's first postage stamp design.

The stamp has a face value of eight cents. One-hundred thirty million were issued.

Background
The Antarctic Treaty was signed on December 1, 1959 by the United States and eleven other nations involved in scientific research on the continent of Antarctica during the preceding biennium; seven of these nations – Argentina, Australia, Chile, France, New Zealand, Norway and the United Kingdom – had competing territorial claims to Antarctica. From November 18 to November 19, 1968, the fifth consultative meeting of the state parties to the treaty was held in Paris. During it, the issue of decennial commemorative stamps by the state parties who had signed the Antarctic Treaty was recommended.

Release

The public announcement of the Antarctic Treaty issue release was made in May 1971 and it was officially released June 23, 1971, the tenth (decennial) anniversary on which the Antarctic Treaty became effective.

The official release was accompanied by a first day ceremony in Washington, D.C. attended by United States Secretary of State William P. Rogers, United States Postmaster General Winton M. Blount, and the ambassadors to the United States of the state parties to the Antarctic Treaty. During the ceremony, Blount presented an album of the stamps to Soviet ambassador Anatoly Dobrynin.

One-hundred thirty million Antarctic Treaty issue stamps were printed.

Proofs
Specimens of the stamp, as well as its plate proofs, are held by the National Philatelic Collection, housed in the National Postal Museum. In 2013, the United States Postal Service (USPS) auctioned on eBay a proof of the Antarctic Treaty issue that contained the handwritten approval of Postmaster General Blount. The proof was one of two such proofs of the Antarctic Treaty issue held in the Postmaster General's Philatelic Collection. It sold for $1,099.99.

Design
The stamp was designed by the acclaimed American postage stamp illustrator Howard Koslow, and was notable as his first postage stamp design. It features a map of Antarctica in white, set on a field of blue, which was adapted from the logo design used on documents of the treaty's consultative meetings. Earlier, in 1965, the Special Committee on Antarctic Research of the International Council of Scientific Unions had called for stamps commemorating the decennial of the treaty to prominently feature the map of Antarctica. Due to competing territorial claims in Antarctica, the simplicity of a map-centered design was considered a matter of political importance.

The stamp has an eight cents face value.

Related stamps 
In addition to the United States, other state parties to the Antarctic Treaty also issued commemorative stamps on its ten-year anniversary.

In 1991, on the thirtieth anniversary of the Antarctic Treaty, the United States issued another stamp commemorating the Antarctic Treaty. Howard Koslow returned to design the fifty-cent, airmail, stamp which depicted USCGC Glacier near Ross Island.

See also
 Postage stamps and postal history of the United States

References

Postage stamps of the United States
1971 works
Antarctica agreements
Antarctic culture
Postage stamps of Antarctica